Schützen may refer to:

Schützen (military), a 19th-century German infantryman armed with a rifled musket and used in a skirmishing role
Panzergrenadier, a German term for motorized or mechanized infantry, as introduced during World War II
Schützen am Gebirge, a municipality in Burgenland, Austria
Deutsch Schützen-Eisenberg, a municipality in Burgenland, Austria

See also
Schuetzen Park (Iowa) in Davenport
Schuetzen Park (New Jersey) in North Bergen